Paridactus is a genus of longhorn beetles of the subfamily Lamiinae.

 Paridactus idactiformis Breuning, 1964
 Paridactus tarsalis Gahan, 1898

References

Ancylonotini